ConnectNY (CNY) is a consortium of  New York State academic libraries and the Center for Research Libraries that lend and borrow books from a shared catalog.  Founded in 2003 with Mellon Foundation funding, CNY "supports resource sharing and enhancement of services to users through programs in cooperative collecting, access to electronic resources and physical collections, and expedited interlibrary loan and document delivery." In 2010, CNY became an incorporated 501 (c)3 non-profit organization in New York State.  At that time, CNY consisted of 15 libraries and 16 collections (CRL's holding were incorporated into the catalog).

References

External links 
 ConnectNY.org
 Center for Research Libraries

Library consortia in New York (state)